This is a list of major bushfires in Australia.

, Australian bushfires accounted for over 800 deaths since 1851 and, in 2012, the total accumulated cost was estimated to be 1.6 billion. In terms of monetary cost however, bushfires have not cost as much in financial terms as the damage caused by drought, severe storms, hail, and cyclones, perhaps because they most commonly occur outside highly populated urban areas.

Of all the recorded fires in Australia, the 2009 Black Saturday bushfires in the state of Victoria claimed the largest number of recorded deaths of any individual Australian bushfire or bushfires season173 fatalities over 21 days. The most number of homes destroyed was approximately 3,700 dwellings, attributed to Victoria's 1939 Black Friday bushfires.

The fires of the summer of 2019–2020 affected densely populated areas including holiday destinations resulting in the New South Wales Rural Fire Service  Commissioner, Shane Fitzsimmons, to claim it was "absolutely" the worst bushfire season on record [in that state].  Australian National University described the 2019 fire year as "close to average" and the 2020 fire year as "unusually small".

Some of the most severe Australian bushfires (single fires and fire seasons) have included:

Notes

References

 *
Bushfires
Bushfires